Wilczyn  is a village in Konin County, Greater Poland Voivodeship, in west-central Poland. It is the seat of the gmina (administrative district) called Gmina Wilczyn.

The  has a population of 1,200.

References

Wilczyn